East Jessamine High School is a public high school in Nicholasville, Kentucky, United States. It was opened in 1997 by Jessamine County. Prior to this, the school was divided into two separate institutions: East Jessamine High School and West Jessamine High School. It is the fastest growing high school in Jessamine County.

Academics
East Jessamine High School offers the following AP classes:
 Art
 Biology
 Calculus AB
 Calculus BC
 Chemistry
 English Language
 English Literature
 French
 Physics
 Spanish
 Statistics
 US History
 World History
 US Government & Politics
 Psychology

Extracurricular activities
Academics:
National Merit finalists (2007, 2008, 2009)
Academic Team
Forensics Team (2009 Kentucky Forensics League Coach of the Year Joey Mau, 2009 Kentucky Forensics League Student Competitor of the Year Parker Collins)

Athletics:
Wrestling 
Football
Volleyball
Soccer (boys' and girls')
Basketball (boys' and girls')
Cross country
Tennis
Swimming
Baseball
Softball
Golf (boys' and girls')
Bowling
Cheerleading
Track

References

External links
School web site

Educational institutions established in 1997
Schools in Jessamine County, Kentucky
Public high schools in Kentucky
1997 establishments in Kentucky
Nicholasville, Kentucky